This is a list of dog breeds from India.

Breeds mygreen
 Rajapalayam – sighthound KCI Certified breed.
 Chippiparai – sighthound from Tamil Nadu KCI Certified breed.
 Kombai – sighthoundKCI Certified breed.  
 Kanni – sighthound KCI Certified breed.
 Mudhol Hound – sighthound KCI Certified breed.
 Rampur Greyhound – sighthound from the Rampur district  
 Bully Kutta – Indian mastiff guard dog
 Himalayan Sheepdog – livestock guardian dog
 Bakharwal – livestock guardian dog
 Jonangi
 Banjara Hound
Gull Dong - Guard dog, Hunting dog
Gull Terrier
 Indian pariah dog – pye-dog found throughout the sub-continent
 Indian Spitz
 Kaikadi – sighthound
Kumaon mastiff - hunting dog
 Mahratta Greyhound – sighthound
 Hameerpura Sikar Greyhound - sighthound from the Sikar district of Rajasthan
 Sinhala Hound – pye-dog from Sri Lanka
 Vikhan – livestock guardian dog from Pakistan

See also
 List of dog breeds

References

Citations

Bibliography